Media involvement and tropical cyclones have been carried out in various ways over the past centuries. The passages of hurricanes, typhoons, cyclones, and tropical storms have been reported by newspaper, word of mouth and by telegraph. 

Since the early to mid-20th century, advances in technology have included the radio, television, newsreel footage shown in theaters, mass media and more recently the internet. Internet coverage includes blogs and online news sites that report the data regarding tropical cyclones. 

This article covers the various methods in which the media report tropical cyclones and its effects.

Printed media

Newspaper
Newspaper reports of tropical cyclones and their effects have been in existence since the days before advances in communication came in the mid–19th century. Local and national newspapers like the New York Times or Washington Post have reported the passage of tropical cyclones and their effects. News agencies such as the Associated Press, Reuters, and United Press International also report the passage and effects of tropical cyclones.

Magazines
Magazines publish stories written about a tropical cyclone's during or after the fact. More freedom in narrative structure is permitted in certain magazines, allowing for articles to divulge different aspects of a tropical cyclone. In early years, magazines reports on tropical cyclones were written in news magazines like Time and/or magazines pertaining to science and meteorology like Weatherwise or Monthly Weather Review and National Geographic In the 21st, century however, coverage of tropical cyclones and its effects have been written in more magazines like Vanity Fair, Forbes and others.

Books
Books have been written about tropical cyclones in general and the history of specific tropical cyclones like the 1900 Galveston Hurricane or Hurricane Katrina. These books are ether written by professional meteorologists, scientists or ordinary people. Some notable examples of books about tropical cyclones include Issac's Storm and Florida Hurricanes History.

Electronic media

Telegraph
Before the invention of the radio, electronic media coverage of tropical cyclone was limited to the telegraph which was invented in 1839. A notable example of the telegraph coverage of tropical cyclones was during the 1900 Galveston Hurricane

Radio
Along with the telegraph, radio was also used to cover tropical cyclones. This practice began as early as the 1900s. WX4NHC, an amateur radio station operated by the National Hurricane Center, is an example.

References

Environmental mass media